Álvaro Molina may refer to:
Álvaro Molina (motorcyclist) (born 1976), Spanish motorcyclist
Álvaro Molina (footballer) (born 1994), Spanish footballer